Ann Cunningham may refer to:

Lady Ann Cunningham (d. 1646), led a mixed-sex cavalry troop during the Battle of Berwick in 1639
Ann Pamela Cunningham (1816–1875), credited with saving George Washington's home Mount Vernon from ruin and neglect